Dumpas is a Dusunic language of Malaysia.

Classification
Although King & King (1984) classifies Dumpas as Paitanic, Lobel (2013:396-398) classifies Dumpas as a Dusunic language that is particularly closely related to Sungai Karamuak (also called Sukang), but has been heavily influenced by neighboring Paitanic languages.

Presently, Dumpas is located north of Beluran town, where it is surrounded by Paitanic languages such as Sungai Paitan, Tombonuwo, Lingkabau, and Sungai Beluran (Lobel 2013). Tidung and Tausug are also spoken in the area.

References

King, Julie K., and John Wayne King. 1984. Languages of Sabah: A survey report. C-78. Canberra: Pacific Linguistics, The Australian National University.
Lobel, Jason William. 2013. Philippine and North Bornean languages: issues in description, subgrouping, and reconstruction. Ph.D. dissertation. Manoa: University of Hawai'i at Manoa.

Dusunic languages
Endangered Austronesian languages
Languages of Malaysia